Jonathan P Taylor (born 1973) is a British author, poet and lecturer.

Life 

Taylor was born in 1973 in Stoke-on-Trent and educated at Trentham High School and Warwick University where he studied English Literature, later gaining a PhD from Loughborough University. He is currently a lecturer in Creative Writing at the University of Leicester and co-director of arts organisation Crystal Clear Creators.  Notably for an author and academic, he did not learn to read and write until the age of eight. He lives in Leicestershire with his wife, poet Maria Taylor, and their twin daughters.

Works 

Academic
 
 
 

Memoirs, Novels and Short Stories
 
 
 

Poetry

References

External links 

 
 "Crystal Clear Creators"

Living people
1973 births
People from Trentham, Staffordshire
Alumni of the University of Warwick